Mizdah massacre refers to the murder of 30 migrants in Mizdah in Southwest Libya. 11 migrants were also injured in the massacre by human traffickers. 26 of the migrants were from Bangladesh and four from Africa.

Incident
Libya has become a transit country for migrants seeking to enter Europe. 654 Bangladeshis illegally entered European through Libya from January to April 2020 according European Frontex agency. Migrants pay ten thousand Euro to smugglers in Libya to reach Europe. On 27 May 2020, 30 migrants were shot and killed by human traffickers in Mizdah. 26 of the migrants were from Bangladesh and four from African countries. 36 Bangladeshi migrants were held hostage in the town of Mizdah for ransom by the human traffickers.
The 26 Bangladeshis killed in the massacre were buried in Mizdah. The injured migrants were receiving treatment at a hospital in Tripoli. According to the Government of National Accord the migrants were killed by relatives of a human traffickers, who had been killed during an altercation with migrants after the trafficker demanded more money.

One Bangladeshi migrant, who survived the massacre, reported paying brokers in Bangladesh. The broker accompanied the migrant to Nepal, from there to Dubai, then from Dubai to Egypt, and then handed for to Libyan traffickers at the Egypt-Libya border. The migrants were held in Mizdah and tortured for ransom from their family back in Bangladesh. The traffickers demanded 12 thousand dollars from the family of migrants.

Reaction
The European Union has condemned the killing and reiterated its commitment towards the fight against human traffickers. Bangladesh has called for a quick investigation of the massacre.

Medecins Sans Frontieres called for the evacuation of all migrants from Libya, describing the country as unsafe.

References

Bangladesh–Libya relations
Massacres in Libya
2020 in Libya
2020 murders in Libya
Mass murder in 2020
May 2020 crimes in Africa
Massacres in 2020
Murder in Libya